Spulerina dissotoma is a moth of the family Gracillariidae. It is known from India (Bihar), Japan (Honshū, Kyūshū, Shikoku, Tusima, Hokkaidō and the Ryukyu Islands), Korea, the Russian Far East and Taiwan.

The wingspan is 5.8-7.6 mm.

The larvae feed on Flemingia lineata, Lespedeza bicolor, Lespedeza cyrtobotrya and Pueraria montana. They mine the leaves of their host plant. the mines commonly occur on both the upper and lower sides of the leaves.

References

Spulerina
Moths of Asia
Moths of Japan
Moths described in 1931